Nicholas Purcell may refer to:

 Nicholas Purcell of Loughmoe (1651–1722), Privy Councillor
 Nicholas Purcell (classicist), professor of ancient history
 Nicholas Purcell (MP) (died 1559), English politician